The 2020–21 Djibouti Premier League was the 33rd season of the Djibouti Premier League, the top-tier football league in Djibouti. The season began on 11 December 2020 and ended on 24 April 2021. The 20,000-capacity El Hadj Hassan Gouled Aptidon Stadium is the main venue of the league.

Arta/Solar7, captained by former FC Barcelona midfielder Alex Song, won the league for the first time. The team's forward, Gabriel Dadzie, won the Golden Boot award for a third consecutive season, scoring 26 goals in 18 matches. Samuel Akinbinu, the team's other forward, came second in the scoring standings with 16 goals.

Standings

References

Football leagues in Djibouti
Premier League
Premier League
Djibouti